Lechleiter is a surname. Notable people with the surname include:

 Jakob Lechleiter (born 1911), Swiss politician
 John C. Lechleiter (born 1952), American businessman and chemist
 Paul Lechleiter, partner in German pianomaker Uebel & Lechleiter
 Robert Lechleiter (born 1980), German footballer